The Red River Parish School District is a public school district headquartered in Coushatta, Louisiana, United States.

The district serves all of Red River Parish. The district's mascot is the Bulldog.

Schools

High school
Grades 9-148564
Red River Senior High School  (Coushatta) (Bulldogs)

Junior high school
Grades 6-8
Red River Junior High School (Coushatta)

Elementary school
Grades PK-5
Red River Elementary School (Coushatta)

Academy
Grades PK-12
Riverdale Academy (Unincorporated area)

Other Campuses
Red River Parish Springville Educational Center (Unincorporated area)
Ware Youth Center (Unincorporated area)

Demographics
Total Students (as of October 1, 2007): 1,509
Gender
Male: 51%
Female: 49%
Race/Ethnicity
African American: 66.27%
Caucasian: 32.80%
Hispanic: 0.46%
Asian: 0.27%
Native American: 0.20%
Socio-Economic Indicators
At-Risk: 85.82%
Free Lunch: 78.40%
Reduced Lunch: 7.42%

School uniforms
All students enrolled in Red River Parish Schools are required to wear uniforms.

See also
List of school districts in Louisiana
Benjamin Milam Teekell

References

External links
Red River Parish School District - Official site.

School districts in Louisiana
Education in Red River Parish, Louisiana
School districts in Ark-La-Tex